The Amazing Rhythm Aces is an American country rock group, which has characterized its music as "American music" or "roots music"—a blend of rock, country, blues, R&B, folk, reggae, and Latino. The band is best known for its 1975 hit "Third Rate Romance". They have released 18 albums over 30 years (a period including a 15-year hiatus). The band's music is distinguished by its eclectic scope, literate and often quirky lyrics, and distinctive vocals by lead singer and songwriter Russell Smith.

History 
Members of the Aces played in Fatback, a local band in Knoxville, Tennessee, in the late 1960s and early 1970s, consisting of vocalist and guitarist Russell Smith, bassist Jeff "Stick" Davis, drummer Butch McDade (born David Hugh McDade in Clarksdale, Missouri; February 24, 1946 – November 29, 1998), and Fatback's first lead guitarist Mike Brooks and later Dan Kennedy. The band left Knoxville in the early 1970s.

In 1972, the Aces came together in Memphis, Tennessee, at the recommendation of Barry "Byrd" Burton (born in Greene County, Tennessee; September 7, 1946 – March 10, 2008), who was engineering and producing at the Sam Phillips Recording Studio in Memphis. Davis and McDade, who had recorded and toured with singer-songwriter Jesse Winchester as "The Rhythm Aces", recruited Smith, keyboardist Billy Earheart III, lead guitarist and multi-instrumentalist Burton, and pianist James Hooker to develop a sound mixing of pop, country, and blue-eyed soul.

Stacked Deck, their debut album, released in 1975, resulted in two crossover (rock and country) hits, "Third Rate Romance" and "Amazing Grace (Used to Be Her Favorite Song)", the group's lone Top 10 country single. In 1976, "The End Is Not in Sight (The Cowboy Tune)", from the album Too Stuffed to Jump, won a Grammy for Country Vocal Performance by a Group. "Third Rate Romance" reached No. 1 on the Canadian pop/rock charts. These tracks were engineered by Burton, who produced their first three albums.

Burton left the group after the release of Toucan Do It Too in 1977 and was replaced by Duncan Cameron.

In 1978, the Aces released Burning the Ballroom Down, followed the next year by a self-titled album featuring songs with Joan Baez, Tracy Nelson and the Muscle Shoals Horns. Both albums received critical approval but sold poorly. They released another album, How the Hell Do You Spell Rhythum, before disbanding.

Afterlife 
Smith became a successful songwriter and had some minor successes on the country charts as a solo artist and successfully composed songs for other performers such as Ricky Van Shelton, T. Graham Brown, and Randy Travis. Earheart joined Hank Williams, Jr.'s Bama Band, and Cameron joined Sawyer Brown, a group that found significant chart success in the 1980s with a sound similar to the Amazing Rhythm Aces. Hooker joined Nanci Griffith's band, the Blue Moon Orchestra, in 1987 and became its leader. Hooker retired from touring in 2007 and lives in County Tipperary, Ireland, and Mallorca, Spain, where he continues to keep an active writing and recording schedule.

McDade died of bladder cancer on November 29, 1998, only months after the release of Out of the Blue. He was 52.

Burton became a successful producer and session guitarist. He released a solo instrumental country album, Byrd Braynz (ADF Records), in 2002. He died on March 10, 2008, from complications of myelodysplastic syndrome, a rare form of blood cancer, at the age of 61.

Reunion 
The Aces re-formed in 1994. The group, composed of Smith, Davis, McDade, Earheart, Hooker, and new guitarist-mandolinist Danny Parks, released Ride Again, an album of new renditions of their biggest hits.

They composed songs for a comeback album, Out of the Blue, released in mid-1998 with drummer Michael Organ as a temporary replacement for the ailing McDade. Drummer Bill Bonnette played with the band in 1999. Davis left the group in 2004, shortly after the release of "Nothin' but the Blues" to join Sneaky Pete Kleinow and Garth Hudson in Burrito Deluxe.  Since 2007, the Aces' lineup included original members Smith and Earheart along with Kelvin Holly on lead guitar. The boogie- and blues-inspired Nothin' but the Blues was followed by Midnight Communion, in 2007, which hearkened back to the Aces' eclectic roots music origins.

Following a cancer diagnosis, Russell Smith died in 2019 at age 70.

Discography

Albums

Singles

References

Sources 
 Biography by Jason Ankeny, Allmusic
 PBS listing

External links 
 [ Allmusic]
 Billy Earheart Official site
 James Hookers Official Website
 Butch McDade Obituary
 Barry 'Byrd' Burton Obituary
 Byrd Interview
 Russell Smith Obituary

ABC Records artists
American country rock groups
Musical groups from Memphis, Tennessee
Grammy Award winners